John Michell (25 December 1724 – 21 April 1793) was an English natural philosopher and clergyman who provided pioneering insights into a wide range of scientific fields including astronomy, geology, optics, and gravitation. Considered "one of the greatest unsung scientists of all time", he is the first person known to have proposed the existence of black holes, and the first to have suggested that earthquakes travelled in (seismic) waves. Recognizing that double stars were a product of mutual gravitation, he was the first to apply statistics to the study of the cosmos. He invented an apparatus to measure the mass of the Earth, and explained how to manufacture an artificial magnet. He has been called the father both of seismology and of magnetometry.

According to one science journalist, "a few specifics of Michell's work really do sound like they are ripped from the pages of a twentieth century astronomy textbook." The American Physical Society (APS) described Michell as being "so far ahead of his scientific contemporaries that his ideas languished in obscurity, until they were re-invented more than a century later". The Society stated that while "he was one of the most brilliant and original scientists of his time, Michell remains virtually unknown today, in part because he did little to develop and promote his own path-breaking ideas".

Early life, education and professional positions
John Michell was born in 1724 in Eakring, in Nottinghamshire, the son of Gilbert Michell, a priest, and Obedience Gerrard. Gilbert was the son of William Michell and Mary Taylor of Kenwyn, Cornwall; Obedience was the daughter of Ralph and Hannah Gerrard of London. He was educated at Queens' College, Cambridge, and later became a Fellow of Queens'. He obtained his M.A. degree in 1752, and his B.D. degree in 1761. He was Tutor of the college from 1751 to 1763; Praelector in Arithmetic in 1751; Censor in Theology in 1752; Praelector in Geometry in 1753; Praelector in Greek in 1755 and 1759; Senior Bursar in 1756; Praelector in Hebrew in 1759 and 1762; Censor in Philosophy and Examiner in 1760. "He was nominated Rector of St Botolph's, Cambridge, on 28 March 1760, and held this living until June 1763." From 1762 to 1764, he held the Woodwardian Chair of Geology till he was obliged to relinquish it on his marriage.

There is no surviving portrait of Michell; he is said to have been "a little short Man, of a black Complexion, and fat".

In 1910, Sir Edmund Whittaker observed that during the century after Isaac Newton's death, "the only natural philosopher of distinction who lived and taught at Cambridge was Michell", although his "researches seem to have attracted little or no attention among his collegiate contemporaries and successors, who silently acquiesced when his discoveries were attributed to others, and allowed his name to perish entirely from Cambridge tradition". Michell proceeded to take up clerical positions in Compton and then Havant, both in Hampshire. During this period he unsuccessfully sought positions at Cambridge, and as Astronomer Royal.

In 1767, he was appointed rector of St. Michael's Church of Thornhill, near Leeds, Yorkshire, England, a post he held for the rest of his life. He did most of his important scientific work in Thornhill, where he died on 21 April 1793, aged 68. He is buried there. After local pressure, a blue plaque went up on the church wall to commemorate him.

Scientific work
In 1750, Michell published at Cambridge a work of some eighty pages entitled "A Treatise of Artificial Magnets", in which he presented an easy and expeditious method of producing magnets that are superior to the best natural magnets. Besides the description of the method of magnetization which still bears his name, this work contains a variety of accurate observations about magnetism, and features a lucid exposition of the nature of magnetic induction.

At one point, Michell attempted to measure the radiation pressure of light by focusing sunlight onto one side of a compass needle. The experiment was not a success: the needle melted.

Geology and seismology
Until the late 20th century Michell was considered important primarily because of his work on geology. His most important geological essay, written after the 1755 Lisbon earthquake, was entitled "Conjectures concerning the Cause and Observations upon the Phaenomena of Earthquakes" (Philosophical Transactions, li. 1760). In this paper he introduced the idea that earthquakes spread out as waves through the Earth, and that they involve the offsets in geological strata now known as faults. He was able to estimate both the epicentre and the focus of the Lisbon earthquake, and may also have been the first to suggest that a tsunami is caused by a submarine earthquake.

Michell's essay not only provided insights on earthquakes but also, more broadly, represented an advance in the understanding of the geology of the Earth's crust. He recognized that the Earth is composed "of regular and uniform strata", some of which have been interrupted by upheavals. "The most important part of Michell's Earthquake paper", in the view of one commentator, "is the account which it contains of what is now known as 'the crust of the Earth.'" Exhibiting a remarkable knowledge of the geological strata in various parts of England and abroad, he drew on his own observations to advance the understanding of sedimentary stratigraphy and was the first to define the Mesozoic stratigraphy in the U.K.

In 1760, as a result of this work, he was elected a member of the Royal Society.

A 1788 letter to Henry Cavendish indicated that Michell continued to be interested in geology several decades after his paper on earthquakes.

Magnetism
Michell studied magnetism and discovered the "inverse-square law", the fact that the magnetic force exerted by each pole of a magnet decreases in proportion to the square of the distance between them. His 1750 paper Treatise of Artificial Magnets, which was written for seamen and instrument makers and intended as a practical manual on how to make magnets, included a list of the "Properties of Magnetical Bodies" that represented a major contribution to the understanding of magnetism.

Gravity

Michell devised a torsion balance for measuring the mass of the Earth, but died before he could use it. His instrument passed into the hands of his lifelong friend Henry Cavendish, who first performed in 1798 the experiment now known as the Cavendish Experiment. Placing two 1-kg lead balls at the ends of a six-foot rod, he suspended the rod horizontally by a fibre attached to its centre. Then he placed a massive lead ball beside each of the small ones, causing a gravitational attraction that led the rod to turn clockwise. By measuring the rod's movement, Cavendish was able to calculate the force exerted by each of the large balls on the 1-kg balls. From these calculations, he was able to provide an accurate estimate of the gravitational constant and of the mass and average density of the Earth. Cavendish gave Michell full credit for his accomplishment.

In 1987, gravity researcher A. H. Cook wrote:

The most important advance in experiments on gravitation and other delicate measurements was the introduction of the torsion balance by Michell and its use by Cavendish. It has been the basis of all the most significant experiments on gravitation ever since.

Double stars
Michell was the first person to apply the new mathematics of statistics to the study of the stars, and demonstrated in a 1767 paper that many more stars occur in pairs or groups than a perfectly random distribution could account for. He focused his investigation on the Pleiades cluster, and calculated that the likelihood of finding such a close grouping of stars was about one in half a million. He concluded that the stars in these double or multiple star systems might be drawn to one another by gravitational pull, thus providing the first evidence for the existence of binary stars and star clusters. His work on double stars may have influenced his friend William Herschel's research on the same topic.

Black holes
In a paper for the Philosophical Transactions of the Royal Society of London, read on 27 November 1783, Michell was the first to propose the existence of  black holes, which he called "dark stars". Having accepted Newton's corpuscular theory of light, which posited that light consists of minuscule particles, he reasoned that such particles, when emanated by a star, would be slowed down by its gravitational pull, and that it might therefore be possible to determine the star's mass based on the reduction in speed. This insight led in turn to the recognition that a star's gravitational pull might be so strong that the escape velocity would exceed the speed of light. Michell calculated that this would be the case with a star more than 500 times the size of the Sun. Since light would not be able to escape such a star, it would be invisible. In his own words:

Michell suggested that there might be many "dark stars" in the universe, and today astronomers believe that black holes do indeed exist at the centers of most galaxies. Similarly, Michell proposed that astronomers could detect "dark stars" by looking for star systems which behaved gravitationally like two stars, but where only one star could be seen. Michell argued that this would show the presence of a "dark star". It was an extraordinarily accurate prediction. All of the dozen candidate stellar black holes in our galaxy (the Milky Way) are in X-ray compact binary systems.

Michell's ideas about gravity and light interested William Herschel, who tried to test them with his powerful telescopes. A few years after Michell came up with the concept of black holes, the French mathematician Pierre-Simon Laplace suggested essentially the same idea in his 1796 book, Exposition du Système du Monde.

It has been written that Michell was so far ahead of his time in regard to black holes that the idea "made little impression" on his contemporaries. "He died in quiet obscurity", states the American Physical Society, "and his notion of a 'dark star' was forgotten until his writings re-surfaced in the 1970s."

Telescopes
Michell constructed telescopes for his own use. One of them, a reflecting telescope with a 10-foot focal length and a 30-inch aperture, was bought by the distinguished astronomer William Herschel after Michell's death. The two men had many interests in common, and exchanged letters at least twice, but only one record suggests that they ever met. Herschel recorded having visited and seen Michell's telescope while in the area in 1792; Michell was already frail, and his telescope was in disrepair. Herschel bought the telescope the following year, for £30.

Other professional activities

Michell also wrote a paper on surveying that his biographer has described as "elegant" in theory. 
Michell was elected a member of the Royal Society. He was first invited to meetings of the Royal Society in 1751 as a guest of Sir George Savile, who would become his patron. He later attended meetings "one to four times a year", while at Cambridge. His paper on the cause of earthquakes was read before the Society beginning on 28 February 1760, leading to a recommendation by Savile and another member that Michell be invited to join the Society. He was elected a member on 12 June 1760.

Michell followed his work in seismology with work in astronomy, and after publishing his findings in 1767 he served on an astronomical committee of the Royal Society.

More recently, Michell has become known for his letter to Cavendish, published in 1784, on the effect of gravity on light. This paper was rediscovered in the 1970s and is now recognised as anticipating several astronomical ideas that had been considered to be 20th century innovations. Michell is now credited with being the first to study the case of a heavenly object massive enough to prevent light from escaping (the concept of escape velocity was well known at the time). Such an object, which he called a dark star, would not be directly visible, but could be identified by the motions of a companion star if it was part of a binary system. The classical minimum radius for escape assuming light behaved like particles of matter is numerically equal to the Schwarzschild Radius in general relativity.  Michell also suggested using a prism to measure what is now known as gravitational redshift, the gravitational weakening of starlight due to the surface gravity of the source. Michell acknowledged that some of these ideas were not technically practical at the time, but wrote that he hoped they would be useful to future generations. By the time that Michell's paper was rediscovered nearly two centuries later, these ideas had been reinvented by others.

Personal life
Michell was a man of "wide latitude in religious belief". He was described by a contemporary as "a little short man, of black complexion, and fat", and was "esteemed a very ingenious Man, and an excellent Philosopher." During his years at Thornhill, he welcomed visitors including Benjamin Franklin, Joseph Priestley, Jan Ingenhousz, and Henry Cavendish (the discoverer of hydrogen). Michell wrote to Franklin in 1767 describing his first visit to Thornhill, "the place I told you I was going to remove to".

Priestley lived in nearby Birstall for a time. It was at Michell's rectory opposite the church that Priestley and Ingenhousz met for the first time. At the same meeting John Smeaton was introduced to Benjamin Franklin and together they viewed the canal that Smeaton had just finished constructing nearby. Michell also helped Smeaton revise his book on the Eddystone Lighthouse.

Michell's first wife was Sarah Williamson (1727–1765), daughter of Luke Williamson and Sutton Holmes, "a young lady of considerable fortune", whom he married in 1764 and who unfortunately died only a year later, in 1765. On 13 February 1773, in Newark, Nottinghamshire, he married Ann Brecknock (1736-1805), daughter of Matthew and Ann Brecknock of Nottinghamshire. They had one child, Mary, who married Sir Thomas Turton of Leeds, son of William Turton Esq. of Kingston Lisle, Berkshire, and Jane Clarke of Hertford, Hertfordshire.

Michell's younger brother Gilbert was a merchant in London who later lived with Michell in Thornhill, where the two brothers were active in local real estate, purchasing many properties in the West Riding of Yorkshire.

Biographies
Michell is the subject of the book Weighing the World: The Reverend John Michell of Thornhill (2012) by Russell McCormmach.

Selected publications
Observations on the Comet of January 1760 at Cambridge, Philosophical Transactions (1760)
Conjectures Concerning the Cause and Observations upon the Phaenomena of Earthquakes, ibid. (1760)
A Recommendation of Hadley's Quadrant for Surveying, ibid. (1765)
Proposal of a Method for measuring Degrees of Longitude upon Parallels of the Equator, ibid. (1766)
An Inquiry into the Probable Parallax and Magnitude of the Fixed Stars, ibid. (1767)
On the Twinkling of the Fixed Stars, ibid. (1767)

References

Sources
 
 Eisenstaedt, Jean, Avant Einstein Relativité, lumière, gravitation, Paris: Seuil (2005)
 
 
 Christa Jungnickel and Russell McCormmach, Cavendish, American Philosophical Society, Philadelphia, 1996, .

External links 

  Alan Ellis, Black Holes – Part 1 – History, Journal of the Astronomical Society of Edinburgh, 39, (1999). Description of Michell's theory of black holes
 
 John Michell biography, from "Our Place in the Universe" by Norman K. Glendenning

1724 births
1793 deaths
18th-century British astronomers
English geologists
18th-century English Anglican priests
Fellows of the Royal Society
Alumni of Queens' College, Cambridge
Fellows of Queens' College, Cambridge
Woodwardian Professors of Geology